In a Sentimental Mood is the twelfth album by New Orleans singer and pianist Dr. John. It spent eleven weeks on the Billboard 200 charts, peaking at #142 on July 8, 1989.

Track listing
"Makin' Whoopee!" (Gus Kahn, Walter Donaldson) (with Rickie Lee Jones) – 4:09
"Candy" (Alex Kramer, Joan Whitney, Mack David) – 5:33
"Accentuate the Positive" (Johnny Mercer) – 3:55
"My Buddy" (Kahn, Donaldson) – 3:50
"In a Sentimental Mood" (Duke Ellington, Irving Mills, Manny Kurtz) – 4:05
"Black Night" (Jessie Mae Robinson) – 4:12
"Don't Let the Sun Catch You Crying" (Joe Greene) – 4:52
"Love for Sale" (Cole Porter) – 5:18
"More Than You Know" (William Rose, Edward Eliscu, Vincent Youmans) – 4:40

Personnel

Musicians
 Dr. John – vocals, keyboards
 Hugh McCracken – guitar (tracks 2-9)
 Paul Jackson Jr. – acoustic guitar (track 1)
 Abraham Laboriel – bass (tracks 1,3)
 Marcus Miller – bass (tracks 4-7, 9)
 David Barard – bass (tracks 2,8)
 Harvey Mason – drums (tracks 1, 3, 6)
 Herlin Riley – drums (tracks 2, 8)
 Jeff Porcaro – drums (tracks 4-5, 7, 9)
 Lenny Castro, Trazi Williams – percussion (track 8)
 David "Fathead" Newman – saxophone (track 2)
 Joel Peskin – saxophone (track 3)
 Marty Paich – horn and string arrangements (tracks 2, 4-5, 7-9)
 Ralph Burns – horn arrangements (tracks 1, 3, 6)

Technical
 Tommy LiPuma – producer
 Allan Sides – engineer (Ocean Way Studio) (tracks 1, 3-5, 7, 9)
 Elliot Scheiner – engineer (Power Station) (tracks 2, 8)
 Bart Stevens, Daniel Bosworth, Danny Mormando, Deb Cornish, Mike Ross, Roy Henderson – assistant engineers
 Doug Sax – mastering
 Janet Levinson – art direction, design
 William Coupon – photography
 Charles Neville – artwork

References

1989 albums
Dr. John albums
Albums arranged by Marty Paich
Albums arranged by Ralph Burns
Albums produced by Tommy LiPuma
Warner Records albums
Jazz albums by American artists